Mu Piscis Austrini, Latinized from μ Piscis Austrini, is a solitary, white-hued star in the southern constellation of Piscis Austrinus. It is visible to the naked eye with an apparent visual magnitude of +4.49.

This star has the spectrum of an A-type subgiant with a stellar classification of A1.5 IVn. It is spinning rapidly with a projected rotational velocity of 308 km/s. This is giving the star an oblate shape with an equatorial bulge that is an estimated 23% larger than the polar radius. This may be coming from an undiscovered companion, since A-type stars are not expected to be a significant source of X-rays.

Mu Piscis Austrini is moving through the Galaxy at a speed of 20 km/s relative to the Sun. Its projected Galactic orbit carries it between 23,800 and 28,500 light years from the center of the Galaxy. Mu Piscis Austrini came closest to the Sun 1.2 million years ago at a distance of 111 light years.

Naming

References

A-type main-sequence stars
Piscis Austrinus
Piscis Austrini, Mu
Durchmusterung objects
Piscis Austrini, 14
210049
109285
8431